Half-giants are fictional beings that have one parent that is a giant and another parent that is a different species.

Description
In most cases, a half-giant is the result of a union between a human and a giant. Often they are of normal size or slightly larger and either have abnormal or supernatural abilities, or are unusually strong and hearty.

One notable half-giant is Antaeus of Greek mythology who is the son of Poseidon and Gaia.

In Arthurian legends, Galehaut and Guinevere were also considered half-giants.

In popular culture
 In The Chronicles of Narnia series, by C.S Lewis, the White Witch is a half-giant.
 In Marvel Comics, Executioner is half-giant due to his parents being an unnamed Storm Giant and an unnamed Skornheim Goddess.
 They feature primarily in fantasy role-playing games, where they often are a playable race (for example, Half-Giants in the Dark Sun setting for Dungeons & Dragons and another race of half-giants in the MMORPG Horizons: Empire of Istaria).
 In the game Dungeons & Dragons, Half-giants are a race of enormous demi-humans who have adapted to a variety of lifestyles in the many harsh terrains of Athas. The origins of the race are unclear.
 Half-giants are also known from the Harry Potter series, by J.K Rowling. Rubeus Hagrid and Olympe Maxime the headmistress of Beauxbatons Academy of Magic are examples.
 In the One Piece manga and anime, there are half-giants known as "Wotans" which are the results of a crossbreeding between fishmen and giants.

Notes

Fantasy creatures

de:Halbriese